The 2018 Zimbabwe Presidential election petition aimed to overturn the Zimbabwe's presidential elections results which declared Emmerson Dambudzo Mnangagwa as victor. The election was held on Monday July 30.

Background 
On 20 August Movement for Democratic Change Alliance (MDC Alliance) president Nelson Chamisa filed an official challenge of the results of the election. On August 3, Emmerson Dambudzo Mnangagwa was declared winner of the elections with 50.8 per cent of the total votes cast to Mr Chamisa's 44.3 per cent. Nelson Chamisa disputed the results.

Chamisa's election petition 

Political experts said that the appeal faces difficulties because of Zimbabwe's political scene and Judicial idiosyncrasies citing that the Judges' own values, perspectives, and secret personal and monetary interests plays a considerably more decisive role with regards to managing the argumentative issues Some political examiners anticipated that the lawful test had minimal shot of achievement.

Respondents 

President Mnangagwa alongside the other 21 losing presidential hopefuls and ZEC were altogether referred to as respondents in the prominent request by the MDC Alliance Leader. In his reaction recorded, Mnangagwa contended that there was no substantial election appeal.

Judges 
MDC Alliance leader Nelson Chamisa's election petition was adjudicated by the 9 judges of the Constitutional Court. Led by Chief Justice Luke Malaba, the case was presided over by the following judges.

 Elizabeth Gwaunza Deputy CJ
 Rita Makarau JCC
 Paddington Garwe JCC
 Chinembiri Bhunu JCC
 Baratkumar Patel JCC
 Ben Hlatshwayo JCC
 Tendai Uchena JCC
 Lavender Makoni JCC

Pre-Case Hearing 
The trial observation mission evaluated the procedures of the petition as far as consistence with regional and global human rights law and principles. Prior to the petition hearing ruling party asserted the issue ought to be rejected in light of the fact that the MDC Alliance vacillated at law by not serving papers to  Mnangagwa on time or to his correct address. The ruling party Zanu-PF said it had picked a team of 12 attorneys for the case documented by Mr Chamisa while Chamisa's leading Lawyer, Adv Thabani Mpofu said his team had adequate proof to turn around the result of the polls.

Case Hearing 
Both Legal advisors for Mnangagwa and the ZEC dismissed the allegations and said Chamisa had failed to provide tangible evidence.

Ruling 
During the case ruling CJ stated that the complaint consisted of general allegations. No allegations of an individual direct control of the procedure was advanced against the first Respondent. All claims were made without identity and particularity. He expressed that no verification or proof was offered, stressing that the court decides matters dependent on facts and proof set before it. Summarizing the unanimous ruling, Chief Justice Luke Malaba said that "the applicant has failed to place before court clear, direct, sufficient and credible evidence" of irregularities and fraud during the presidential vote. Therefore, in terms of section 93(4)(a) of the Constitution of Zimbabwe, Emmerson Dambudzo Mnangagwa was declared the winner of the election.

Aftermath 
Mnangagwa's swearing in ceremony was held on 26 August 2018. After Mnangagwa was officially sworn in as the President of the Republic of Zimbabwe, some people called for coalition government.

References

External links 
 Zimbabwe Legal Information Institute

2018 in Zimbabwe
Emmerson Mnangagwa